The 1970 Trans-American Championship was a motor racing series organised by the Sports Car Club of America for SCCA Sedans. It was the fifth Trans-Am Championship. Ford (Thanks to Parnelli Jones and George Follmer) and still potent Alfa Romeo won the Over 2 Litre and Under 2 Litre titles respectively.

With Porsche's 911 moving to a 2.2L engine, the year marked the resurgence of Alfa Romeo as dominant in the Under 2 Liter class. The year also marked the first win for American Motors, with Mark Donohue driving a Penske Racing-prepared AMC Javelin, winning three races. Also winning for the first time was BMW, in the Under 2 Liter races at Bryar and Bridgehampton.

Schedule
The championship was contested over eleven rounds with separate races at each round for Under 2 Liter and Over 2 Liter cars.

Championships
Points were awarded according to finishing position. Only the highest-placed car scored points for the manufacturer. Only the best 9 finishes counted towards the championship. Drivers' championships were not awarded in Trans-Am until 1972.

Over 2.0L manufacturers
1970 was the first and only year that every Detroit "pony car" manufacturer has a factory-backed team in TransAm.

Under 2.0L manufacturers

References

Trans-Am Series
Transam